The 2023 World Junior Ice Hockey Championships was the 47th edition of the IIHF World Junior Championship, held between December 26, 2022 and January 5, 2023. It was won by Canada, in overtime of the gold-medal game.

The venue was originally scheduled to be Novosibirsk and Omsk, Russia, but Russia's hosting rights were pulled in February 2022 after the Russian invasion of Ukraine. The replacement hosts were Halifax, Nova Scotia and Moncton, New Brunswick, both in Canada. It was the 18th time Canada has hosted the tournament, and the third consecutively.

The relegation round was revived, after a two-year hiatus due to the 2021 Division I, II, and III tournaments having been cancelled.

Top Division

Venues
On May 23, 2018, the IIHF announced Novosibirsk, Russia, as host city. Novosibirsk was to host Group A matches, while the city of Omsk was to host Group B matches.

In February 2022, in condemnation of the Russian invasion of Ukraine, the International Olympic Committee (IOC) called for Russia to be stripped of hosting rights to all international sporting events.  Russia's hosting of the World Juniors and 2023 IIHF World Championship was scheduled to be discussed in a meeting of the IIHF council on February 28, 2022. The IIHF suspended Russia and Belarus from international ice hockey until further notice, and stripped Russia of its hosting rights for the World Junior Championships.

In late-March 2022, Sportsnet journalist Jeff Marek reported that the IIHF had considered Canada as a possible host country for the tournament, which would make it the third consecutive World Junior Championship to be hosted in the country (the previous two tournaments have been hosted in Alberta with Edmonton as the main host city, but were held in a "bubble" behind closed doors and postponed to August 2022 respectively due to the COVID-19 pandemic). On May 5, the IIHF and Hockey Canada announced that Halifax and Moncton would be the hosts of the tournament, beating out announced bids by Regina/Saskatoon, Ottawa/Quebec City, and London/Waterloo. It marks the 20th anniversary of Halifax's previous hosting of the tournament in 2003.

Rosters

Officials
The following officials were assigned by the International Ice Hockey Federation to officiate the 2023 World Junior Championships.

Referees
  Michael Campbell
  Graeden Hamilton
  Andreas Harnebring
  Tomáš Hronský
  Marc Iwert
  Richard Magnusson
  Mathieu Menniti
  Anssi Salonen
  Peter Schlittenhardt
  Jakub Šindel
  Michaël Tscherrig
  Riley Yerkovich

Linesmen
  Dario Fuchs
  Clément Goncalves
  Brandon Grillo
  Onni Hautamäki
  David Klouček 
  Spencer Knox
  Daniel Konc
  Patrick Laguzov
  Daniel Persson
  John Waleski
  Tarrington Wyonzek

Teams
The groups were announced on August 17, 2022, with teams being grouped based on rankings of performance over the previous five tournaments.

Group A (Halifax)
 
 
 
 
 

Group B (Moncton)

Preliminary round
All listed times are local (UTC-4).

Group A
Isak Rosén began the scoring in Group A as Sweden defeated Austria 11–0, with 6 of their goals coming in the second period. Canada lost 5–2 to Czechia in their biggest World Juniors loss since 2020 when they lost 6–0 to Russia. Adam Engström of Sweden scored the lone goal in a tight match to beat Germany 1–0. Austria went scoreless once again against Czechia, recording only 8 shots in a 9–0 defeat. Canada regained their form as they defeated Germany in a convincing 11–2 victory, with Connor Bedard earning 7 points, tying a Canadian World Juniors record. Despite Czechia scoring early in the game, goals from Fabian Wagner and Ludvig Jansson gave the lead to the Swedes. Jiří Ticháček scored an equalizer in the 54th minute, taking the match to overtime. Ludvig Jansson got the winner in the second minute of overtime, earning his second goal of the match. Canada defeated Austria 11–0, with Connor Bedard having 6 points and Austria remaining scoreless after 3 matches. Canada dominated the game with 47 shots, while Austria could only manage 12. Germany defeated Austria 4–2, and despite Austria scoring their first goals of the tournament, they were consequently eliminated to the relegation round. Germany advanced to the quarter-finals for the third consecutive time. Czechia beat Germany in a decisive 8–1 victory, earning Czechia a total of 10 points in the group and winning them Group A. Canada defeated Sweden 6–1, passing Sweden in the standings and finishing second in the group, behind Czechia.

Group B
Finland and Switzerland began the tournament tied by the end of the third period, sending the match to overtime. Attilio Biasca scored a long-range goal to give Switzerland 2 points. Despite being tied for most of the match, the United States put 3 goals past Latvian Patriks Bērziņš in the third period, winning the match 5–2. Slovakia lost 5–2 to Latvia in their first game of the tournament, despite having more shots than the Finns. Finland scored 3 goals in the second period alone. Rodwin Dionicio scored in the 58th minute to send Switzerland to their second consecutive overtime against Latvia. They failed to convert a chance, however, and the match went to a shootout. Liekit Reichle won the match for the Swiss after getting one past the Latvian goaltender. Slovakia defeated the United States 6–3 after Alex Čiernik scored a late goal, taking advantage of the U.S.'s open net. Finland scored 3 against Latvia in regulation time, while the Finnish goaltender, Jani Lampinen, kept a 31-save shutout. The United States recovered from their disappointing loss after beating Switzerland 5–1, with Jimmy Snuggerud scoring two. Slovakia defeated Latvia 3–0, sending Slovakia to the quarter-finals and sending Latvia to the relegation round. By the end of regulation time, Switzerland and Slovakia tied at a score of 3–3. Despite Switzerland winning another shootout, their placement was not affected, and finished 4th place in the group. Both teams qualified for the quarter-finals. The United States won the group after defeating Finland 6–2, regardless of Finland's superior shot count. Although they lost the match, Finland still finished above Slovakia due to their head-to-head result.

Relegation

Note:  was relegated for the 2024 World Junior Ice Hockey Championships.  was promoted for the 2024 Championships.

Playoff round
Teams that won their quarterfinal match were reseeded for the semi-finals in accordance with the following ranking system:

Higher position in their respective group
Greater number of points
Better goal differential (GD)
Greater number of goals scored (GF)
Higher seeding coming into the tournament (As determined by their final placement at the 2022 World Junior Ice Hockey Championships).

Bracket

Quarterfinals
Oliver Kapanen scored early against Sweden to give the lead to Finland, with Leo Carlsson levelling the scores by the second period. Despite Niko Huuhtanen once again putting the Finns ahead, Carlsson and Victor Stjernborg both scored for the Swedes to complete the comeback and win the match 3–2. Top seed Czechia defeated Switzerland 9–1, scoring 4 goals in the second period. They advanced to their first semi-finals since 2022. The United States put 11 past Nikita Quapp and Rihards Babulis in a convincing 11–1 victory, with Logan Cooley earning a hat-trick. A back-and-forth match between Canada and Slovakia saw both teams with 3 goals by the end of regulation, sending the match to overtime. Connor Bedard scored the winner in the 65th minute after weaving his way past multiple Slovak defenders. This marked his 3rd point of the match and his 21st of the tournament, maintaining his World Juniors record.

Semifinals
In their second meeting in the tournament, Czechia advanced to their first final since 2001 after defeating Sweden 2–1. Ludvig Jansson scored first for Sweden, but David Jiříček equalized with less than a minute of regulation time. In the last minute of overtime, just as the match was about to go to a shootout, Jiří Kulich scored to send Czechia to the final. Canada made a statement against rivals United States by beating them 6–2, sending Canada to their 4th consecutive World Juniors final. Despite United States leading 2–0 after 10 minutes, Canada soon found their form and scored 6 past the Americans.

Bronze medal game
The United States defeated Sweden in a 8–7 thriller, the most goals in a single World Juniors match since an 18 goal match between Canada and Germany in 2021. Chaz Lucius scored a hat-trick after a deflection off Swedish goaltender Carl Lindbom found its way to Lucius, who slotted it in the side netting to score the winning goal in overtime.

Gold medal game

Statistics

Scoring leaders 

GP = Games played; G = Goals; A = Assists; Pts = Points; +/− = Plus–minus; PIM = Penalties In MinutesSource: IIHF.com

Goaltending leaders 

(minimum 40% team's total ice time)

TOI = Time on ice (minutes:seconds); GA = Goals against; GAA = Goals against average; SA = Shots against; Sv% = Save percentage; SO = ShutoutsSource: IIHF.com

Final standings

Awards
Best players selected by the directorate:
Best Goaltender:  Adam Gajan
Best Defenceman:  David Jiříček
Best Forward:  Connor Bedard
Source: IIHF

Media All-Stars:
MVP:  Connor Bedard
Goaltender:  Tomáš Suchánek
Defencemen:  David Jiříček /  Ludvig Jansson
Forwards:  Logan Cooley /  Jiří Kulich /  Connor Bedard
Source: IIHF

Division I

Group A
The tournament was held in Asker, Norway, from 11 to 17 December 2022. Host nation Norway has been promoted to the 2024 Top Division World Junior Championships. Slovenia has been relegated to the 2024 Division I B Group.

Group B
The tournament was held in Bytom, Poland, from 11 to 17 December 2022. Japan has been promoted to the 2024 Division I A Group. South Korea has been relegated to the 2024 Division II A Group.

Division II

Group A
The tournament was held in Kaunas, Lithuania, from 11 to 17 December 2022. Croatia has been promoted to the 2024 Division I B Group. Romania has been relegated to the 2024 Division II B Group.

Group B
The tournament was played in Reykjavík, Iceland, from 16 to 22 January 2023. China has been promoted to the 2024 Division II A, replacing the relegated Romania. Mexico has been relegated to the 2024 Division III.

Division III

The tournament was held in Istanbul, Turkey, from 26 January to 2 February 2023. The winner, Australia, has been promoted to the 2024 Division II B Group, replacing Mexico, the relegated team from Division II B Group.

Group A

Group B

Playoffs
Teams are reseeded after the quarterfinals, winner is promoted to Division II B.

References

2023
World Junior Championships
World Junior Championships
2023 World Junior Ice Hockey Championships
Sports events affected by the 2022 Russian invasion of Ukraine
World Junior Ice Hockey
World Junior Ice Hockey
2022 in Nova Scotia
2023 in Nova Scotia
2022 in New Brunswick
Sport in Moncton
Ice hockey competitions in Halifax, Nova Scotia
Ice hockey competitions in New Brunswick